Fancies is a cycle of six choral settings by John Rutter, created around whimsical themes and based on text from poets such as Shakespeare, Thomas Campion (1567–1620), Edward Lear (1812–1888) and others. The collection was originally written in 1971 and remastered in 2005.

Track listing
Fancies – for choir and chamber orchestra
(1)  Tell me, where is fancy bred – 1:44
(2) There is a garden in her face – 3:52
(3) The urchins' song – 2:00
(4)  Riddle song – 3:13
(5)  Midnight's bell – 2:16
(6) The bellman's song – 2:45
Baritone solo: Simon Davies

Suite Antique - for flute, harpsichord and strings 
By John Rutter
Flute: Duke Dobing, Harpsichord: Wayne Marshall
(1) Prelude – 3:20
(2) Ostinato – 1:37
(3) Aria – 3:03
(4)  Waltz – 3:02
(5)Chanson – 3:10
(6) Rondeau – 2:43

Five Childhood Lyrics – for unaccompanied choir
By John Rutter
(1) Monday's child – 2:53
(2) The owl and the pussy-cat – 1:42
(3) Windy nights – 1:08
(4) Matthew, Mark, Luke and John – 1:46
Soprano solo: Caroline Ashton
(5) Sing a song of sixpence 1:42

When Icicles Hang – for choir and orchestra
By John Rutter
(1) Icicles – 3:54
(2) Winter nights – 2:30
(3)  Good ale – 2:43
(4)  Blow, blow, thou winter wind – 3:52
(5) Winter awakeneth all my care – 5:53
Tenor solo: Nicholas Wilson, Flute: Duke Dobing
(6)  Hay, ay – 2:21

References

External links

2005 classical albums
Compositions by John Rutter